Ole Christian Hammerfjell Sæter (born 30 March 1996) is a Norwegian footballer who plays as a striker for Rosenborg.

Career
Sæter first caught the attention of Rosenborg when he played for Ranheim in 2020.

Sæter then later joined Rosenborg in January 2021. He made his first-team debut on 30 May 2021 when he came on as a substitute in Rosenborg's Eliteserien match against Stabæk.

Career statistics

Club

References

External links
 Profile at RBK.no

1996 births
Living people
Footballers from Trondheim
Norwegian footballers
Nardo FK players
Ranheim Fotball players
Rosenborg BK players
Ullensaker/Kisa IL players
Norwegian Third Division players
Norwegian Second Division players
Norwegian First Division players
Eliteserien players
Association football forwards